Cerotainia albipilosa is a species of robber flies in the family Asilidae.

Identification:

References

External links

 

albipilosa
Articles created by Qbugbot
Insects described in 1930